Nishizaki (written: 西崎 lit. "west peninsula") is a Japanese surname. Notable people with the surname include:

, Japanese aviator
, Japanese classical violinist
, Japanese film producer

Japanese-language surnames